MFF Support is the official fan club for Swedish football club Malmö FF. Founded on November 1, 1992, it has 2,195 members as of January 2014. Based on the number of members it is one of largest fan clubs in Sweden. Since the founding of the fan club in the early 1990s the number of members has been rising until recently after the 2005 season. The current chairman is Thelma Ernst who has had the post since February 2017.

Current Board
As of 20 May 2017

Chairman: Thelma Ernst 
Vice Chairman: Kaveh Hosseinpour 
Board Members: Ola Larsson, Sebastian Olofsson, Danny Bernardo Hörlin, Gustav Rosengren, Johanna Nilsson 
Deputy Directors: Åsa Wendin, Jenny Åberg

Chairmen

History
MFF Support found itself in the limelight during a Royal League game in 2005, the first season of the Scandinavian Royal League Football Tournament. At this event, the Danish police allegedly attacked the members of the fan club without provocation at Parken, Copenhagen. MFF Support held the police officers accountable for this scandal, and this event made several headlines in Denmark back in 2005. 2008 the officers were convicted for misconduct in Danish court.

Footnotes

External sources
  
 mff.se -  MFF Support at Malmö FF

Malmö FF
Swedish football supporters' associations